Jelline Floriska van Houten (born 1 September 1978) is a Dutch actress. She has acted in Dutch films, musicals, and television series. She also played Sabine in the British TV series Fresh Meat.

She won the John Kraaijkamp Musical Award twice, in 2006 for her role in the musical Turks fruit and in 2010 for her role in the musical Dromen... zijn bedrog.

Early life and education

Jelline Floriska van Houten was born on 1 September 1978 in Culemborg in the Netherlands, the daughter of Margje Stasse and the writer and broadcaster Theodore van Houten. She is the younger sister of actress Carice van Houten. She later studied production design at the Netherlands Film and Television Academy in Amsterdam.

Acting career
While studying at the Film and Television Academy, Van Houten made her film debut as an obsessed killer in Liefje (2001). She was nominated for a Gouden Notekraker. The jury which nominated her said that "her surprising début holds a lot in store for the future".

In 2006, Van Houten won a John Kraaijkamp Musical Award for her leading role of Olga in the musical Turks Fruit (2005).

She played Sheila in the musical Hair (2007). In 2010, she won another John Kraaijkamp Musical Award for her supporting role in the small musical production Dromen... zijn bedrog (2009). She played the role of Daan in the film Jackie (2012), alongside her sister Carice van Houten, and she was nominated for the Golden Calf for Best Actress but did not win.

In 2022, she appeared in the comedy series Tropenjaren.

Personal life
Van Houten was married to Koppe Koppeschaar until 2016; they have two children.

Filmography

Films

TV series

References

External links

1978 births
21st-century Dutch actresses
Dutch film actresses
Dutch musical theatre actresses
Dutch people of Scottish descent
Dutch television actresses
Living people
People from Culemborg